The Coolmore Turf Mile Stakes is a Grade I American thoroughbred horse race for three year olds and older over a distance of one mile on the turf held annually in October at Keeneland Race Course in Lexington, Kentucky during the fall meeting.

History 

The inaugural running of the event was on 11 October 1986 as the Keeneland Breeders' Cup Stakes at a distance of  miles with added purse incentive for horses that were entered to the Breeders' Cup. The event was won by the 21-1 Ohio bred longshot Leprechauns Wish in a time of 1:51.

The added purses from the Breeders' Cup high quality participants and the race was classified as Grade III in 1988. The winner of the fourth running in 1989, the British bred Steinlen in his next start won the Breeders' Cup Mile at Gulfstream Park.

In 1994 the distance of the event was decreased to one mile.

In 1998 the event was upgraded to Grade II and in 2001 to Grade I.

In 1999 Shadwell Farm became the sponsor of the event, and in 2004 the event was renamed to the Shadwell Turf Mile Stakes. Shadwell's sponsorship lasted until 2020. After the race's name reverted to the Keeneland Turf Mile Stakes for 2021, it was announced that John Magnier's Coolmore Stud would become the title sponsor. The Coolmore Turf Mile will carry a $1 million purse for its 2022 running.

The event continues to be part of the Breeders' Cup Challenge series with the winner automatically qualifying for the Breeders' Cup Mile.

Records 
Time record:
1 mile:  1:33.72 – Annapolis    (2022)
 miles: 1:48.36 – Lotus Pool (1992)

Margins
 lengths – Nothing to Lose  (2004)

Most wins
 2 – Dumaani (1995, 1996)
 2 – Gio Ponti (2010, 2011)
 2 – Wise Dan (2012, 2014)

Most wins by an owner
 3 – Rick Nichols, lessee from Shadwell Racing  (1995, 1996, 2000)

Most wins by a jockey
 4 – Robby Albarado (2004, 2008, 2009, 2013)

Most wins by a trainer
 3 – Kiaran McLaughlin (1995, 1996, 2000)

Winners 

Legend:

Notes:

ƒ Filly or Mare

See also 
 List of American and Canadian Graded races

References 

Open mile category horse races
Graded stakes races in the United States
Grade 1 stakes races in the United States
Grade 1 turf stakes races in the United States
Breeders' Cup Challenge series
Keeneland horse races
Recurring sporting events established in 1986
1986 establishments in Kentucky